Euphorbia acalyphoides is a species of plant in the family Euphorbiaceae. It is native to Angola, Chad, Djibouti, Eritrea, Ethiopia, Kenya, Saudi Arabia, Somalia, Sudan, Tanzania, and Yemen. Two subspecies are recognized: E. a. acalyphoides and "E. a. cicatricosa''.

The plant is an annual herb that grows to 45 cm. high with spreading branches. Leaves are 4 × 2 cm.

References 

acalyphoides
Flora of Angola
Flora of Chad
Flora of Djibouti
Flora of Eritrea
Flora of Ethiopia
Flora of Kenya
Flora of Saudi Arabia
Flora of Somalia
Flora of Sudan
Flora of Tanzania
Flora of Yemen